Black House is a historic house in McMinnville, Tennessee, U.S..

History
The house was built circa 1825 for Jesse Coffee. From 1830 to 1849, it belonged to Samuel Hervey Laughlin, the editor of the Nashville Banner and the Nashville Union, two newspapers based in Nashville, Tennessee, who served as a member of the Tennessee Senate. It was acquired by Thomas Black, the mayor of McMinnville, in 1874, and it remained in the Black family until the 1980s.

Architectural significance
The house was designed in the Federal architectural style. It has been listed on the National Register of Historic Places since November 17, 1983.

References

External links 

 Stuart A. Rose Manuscript, Archives, and Rare Book Library, Emory University: Samuel Hervey Laughlin diary, 1845-1847

Houses on the National Register of Historic Places in Tennessee
Federal architecture in Tennessee
Houses completed in 1825
National Register of Historic Places in Warren County, Tennessee